is a New Zealand born, Japanese rugby union player who plays as a wing. He has also played international rugby league for Japan.

References

1990 births
Japanese rugby union players
Japan national rugby league team players
Japan international rugby union players
Toyota Verblitz players
Living people
Rugby union wings
New Zealand expatriate sportspeople in Japan
Sunwolves players
Rugby union fullbacks